Peterstown is an unincorporated community in LaSalle County, Illinois, United States.

References 

 Hettinger, Paul. "Sts. Peter and Paul Parish Peterstown: A Continuing History." 1997. Print.
 The Peterstown History Collection

Unincorporated communities in Illinois
Unincorporated communities in LaSalle County, Illinois
Ottawa, IL Micropolitan Statistical Area